The New Canaan Branch is an 8.2-mile (13 km) long branch line of the Metro-North Railroad New Haven Line that begins from a junction east of downtown Stamford, Connecticut, north to New Canaan. It opened in 1868 as the New Canaan Railroad.

History
The New Canaan Railroad was chartered in May 1866 as a short branch of the New York & New Haven Railroad. It opened July 4, 1868 when a train ran from Stamford to New Canaan. Within a year of the opening of operations a branch from the NY&NH main line south in Stamford to the  pier at the Pine Island Steamboat Landing was opened to allow passengers and freight to switch to steamboats running on Long Island Sound. Despite such attempts to increase revenue on January 1, 1879, the company went bankrupt, and it was taken over in foreclosure in 1883 by the Stamford and New Canaan Railroad, which incorporated in 1882. The New York, New Haven & Hartford Railroad leased the line on October 1, 1884, and on October 1, 1890, it was merged into the NYNH&H.

On November 1, 1907, the use of 500-volt DC overhead catenary was discontinued. In 1908, it was replaced with 11,000 volt AC operation. Costs were reduced by supplying the line from the Cos Cob station instead of by independent power.

The NYNH&H was merged into Penn Central in 1969. On January 1, 1971, the State of Connecticut leased operation of passenger service along the New Canaan Branch to Penn Central for $100,000 per year. On July 17, 1972, Stations Woodway and Springdale Cemetery were both closed. On April 10, 1972, Penn Central briefly suspended off-peak service on the branch to install high-level platforms at stations. In 1983, the Metro-North Commuter Railroad took over the operation of trains on the branch.

Current operation

Like the New Haven mainline from Mt. Vernon, New York, to New Haven, Connecticut, the entire branch is electrified with overhead catenary, although it is currently the only entirely electrified branch of the New Haven Line. Beginning in March 2011, the newly delivered Kawasaki M8 railcars started running in revenue service along the branch, and eventually took over operation from the older Budd M2 railcars.

Improvements
As of July 2007, a Stamford East Side station is under consideration for the line or just past it on the New Haven Line.

Improvements are planned on the line to make service more frequent. A siding will be built at Springdale, and there will be station and platform improvements. Construction is expected to cost $15 million with construction starting in 2020.

Incidents
On August 20, 1969 at about 8:20 p.m., a northbound commuter train with a 3-man crew and about 60 to 80 passengers hit an empty southbound train carrying only 5 employees, killing 4 and injuring 40 just north of the Hoyt Street crossing in Darien. The lead cars of each train were almost completely destroyed. The National Transportation Safety Board report concluded that the cause was the northbound train's failure to stop at a meeting point as stated on train orders.

On July 13, 1976, two trains collided, killing two and injuring 29. In October 1976, the CDOT released their report which only blamed the engineer of the northbound train (Number 1994) for excessive speed. The engineer's union contended that there was a problem with the train brakes, that there was an automatic track lubricator which had been putting down excessive oil for two weeks before the incident and an insufficient signal system. The National Transportation Safety Board released their final report on the incident on May 19, 1977 as Report Number RAR-77-04. That report concluded that the cause was "the failure of the engineer of train No. 1994 to perceive the train ahead and to apply the brakes at the earliest possible time". It also cited problems with the design of the signal system, design of the M2's exit doors and interior design of the trains.

The New Canaan Branch was severely impacted by Hurricane Sandy on October 29–30, 2012. The line was blocked by fallen trees in 37 different locations; many of these trees also brought down the overhead catenary wires. Shuttle buses replaced all trains. The railroad announced that regular service resumed on November 13. This resumption was marred by slippery rails caused by rain and fallen leaves, to the extent that service had to be shut down again that afternoon to deploy Metro-North's rail-washing train. Train service resumed in time for the evening commute.

Stations

The following connecting services are available to Amtrak, Metro-North Railroad, Shore Line East, and CT Transit.

See also
 Connecticut Commuter Rail Council
 List of New York, New Haven and Hartford Railroad precursors

References

Philip C. Blakeslee, A Brief History Lines West Of The New York, New Haven and Hartford Railroad Co. (1953)

External links

 The New Canaan Branch Line

Metro-North Railroad
Rail infrastructure in Connecticut
Passenger rail transportation in Connecticut
New York, New Haven and Hartford Railroad lines
Companies affiliated with the New York, New Haven and Hartford Railroad
Transportation in Stamford, Connecticut
New Canaan, Connecticut
Transportation in Fairfield County, Connecticut
Railway lines opened in 1868